Maltebrunia is a genus of African plants in the grass family.

 Species
 Maltebrunia leersioides Kunth – Madagascar
 Maltebrunia letestui (Koechlin) Koechlin – Cameroon, Gabon, Republic of the Congo
 Maltebrunia maroana Aug.DC – Madagascar
 Maltebrunia schliebenii (Pilg.) C.E.Hubb.  – Tanzania

 formerly included
Maltebrunia prehensilis - Prosphytochloa prehensilis – South Africa, Eswatini

References

Poaceae genera
Grasses of Africa
Taxa named by Carl Sigismund Kunth
Oryzoideae